Austromitra analogica is a species of small sea snail, marine gastropod mollusc in the family Costellariidae, the ribbed miters. This snail is found under rocks and in algae from the intertidal zone to a depth of 570 m along the coasts from Southern Queensland down to the southeast and southern Australia and Tasmania.

References

 Wilson, B., 1994. Australian Marine Shells. Prosobranch Gastropods. Vol. 2. Odyssey Publishing, Kallaroo, Western Australia. 1–370.
 Turner H. (2001) Katalog der Familie Costellariidae Macdonald 1860 (Gastropoda: Prosobranchia: Muricoidea). Hackenheim: Conchbooks. 100 pp

analogica
Gastropods described in 1845